Where Do We Go from Here may refer to:

Film
 Where Do We Go from Here? (1945 film), an American film directed by Gregory Ratoff
 Where Do We Go from Here? (2015 film), a Scottish film directed by John McPhail

Television
 OWN Spotlight: Where Do We Go From Here?, a television special by Oprah Winfrey

Literature
 Where Do We Go from Here? (novel) or Does Anyone Ever Listen?, a 1998 young-adult novel by Rosie Rushton
 Where Do We Go from Here: Chaos or Community?, a 1967 book by Martin Luther King, Jr.
 Where Do We Go from Here? (anthology), a 1971 science fiction anthology edited by Isaac Asimov
 Where Do We Go from Here?, a 1938 Broadway play by Dwight Taylor 
 "Where Do We Go from Here?", an essay by Willy Ley in SF '58: The Year's Greatest Science Fiction and Fantasy

Music

Albums
 Where Do We Go from Here (album), by Pillar, 2004
 Where Do We Go from Here? (album) or the title song, by Kenny Wheeler and John Taylor, 2004
 Where Do We Go from Here, by Michael Damian, 1989

Songs
 "Where Do We Go from Here?" (1917 song), written by Howard Johnson and Percy Wenrich
 "Where Do We Go from Here?" (Chicago song), 1977
 "Where Do We Go from Here" (Cliff Richard song), 1982
 "Where Do We Go from Here" (Deborah Cox song), 1996
 "Where Do We Go from Here" (Filter song), 2002
 "Where Do We Go from Here" (Hank Smith song), 1971
 "Where Do We Go from Here" (Stacy Lattisaw song), 1989
 "Where Do We Go from Here" (Vanessa Williams song), 1996
 "Where Do We Go from Here", by Alicia Keys from As I Am, 2007
 "Where Do We Go from Here?", by The Band from Cahoots, 1971
 "Where Do We Go from Here", by Charles Bradley from Victim of Love, 2013
 "Where Do We Go from Here", by Chris Rene, 2011
 "Where Do We Go from Here?", by Enchantment from Journey to the Land Of... Enchantment, 1979
 "Where Do We Go from Here?", by Jamiroquai from Synkronized, 1999
 "Where Do We Go from Here?", by the Partridge Family from Bulletin Board, 1973
 "Where Do We Go from Here", by Svenstrup & Vendelboe from Svenstrup & Vendelboe, 2012
 "Where Do We Go from Here?", by Yoko Ono from Rising, 1995
 "Where Do We Go from Here?", from the TV series Buffy the Vampire Slayer, in the episode "Once More, With Feeling", 2001
 "Where Do We Go from Here (Interlude)", by Tupac Shakur from R U Still Down? (Remember Me), 1997

See also
A sega nakade?, a 1988 Bulgarian film with the English title And Where Do We Go from Here?